Chromium is a chemical element with symbol Cr and atomic number 24.

Chromium may also refer to:
 Chromium (computer graphics), a system for OpenGL rendering on clusters of computers
 Chromium (web browser), the open source counterpart to Google Chrome
 ChromiumOS, the open source operating system counterpart to Google ChromeOS
 Chromium (film), a 2015 Albanian film

See also

 Chromium deficiency, for the role of chromium in biology and nutrition
 Chromium B.S.U., an open-source space shooter game
 Chrome (disambiguation)
 Cr (disambiguation)
 Isotopes of chromium